Yarden Gerbi (or Jerbi, ; born July 8, 1989) is an Israeli former judoka world champion. She won an Olympic bronze medal competing for Israel at the 2016 Summer Olympics, in Women's 63 kg Judo.

Gerbi won the gold medal at the 2013 World Judo Championships in the -63 kg (139 lbs.) category. She won the Israeli championship five times by the age of 24, and was a silver medalist in the 2009 Maccabiah Games.

Personal life
Gerbi was born in Kfar Saba, Israel, to a family of Sephardic Jewish (Tunisian-Jewish) descent from Djerba. She was raised and also currently resides in Netanya, Israel. Her nicknames are Jordan, Gerb, and Denush. She attended the Open University of Israel, studying Economics and Management.

Judo career

Early career
Gerbi, who began practicing judo at age 6, trains with club Meditav Netanya. Shani Hershko, former coach of the Israeli women's national judo team, has been her trainer since childhood.

Gerbi twice won the Israeli judo championship. She won the silver medal in the 2012 European Judo Championships, and bronze in the 2013 European Judo Championships.

In 2007, she won the Israel Championships.

In 2008, Gerbi won the Israel Championships and the Under-23 Israel Championships, and took third in the Under-20 category in the European Championships.

In 2009, she won the Israel Championships and the Belo Horizonte World Cup, placed second in the 2009 Maccabiah Games, and took third place in the Qingdao Grand Prix.

In 2010, she came in second in the Qingdao Grand Prix, the Baku World Cup and the Birmingham World Cup, third in the Warsaw World Cup, and came in 7th place at the Tokyo World Championships. In 2011, she won the Israeli Championships, came in second in the San Salvador World Cup and the Miami World Cup, third in the Moscow Grand Slam and the World Masters Baku, and fifth in the 2011 European Judo Championships. However, she was eliminated in the second round of the 2011 world championship and did not qualify for Israel's 2012 Olympic team.

In 2012, she won the Tashkent World Cup and the Israel Championships, took second in the 2012 European Judo Championships in Russia, and took third in the Düsseldorf Grand Prix.

In 2013, prior to the world championships she won the Baku Grand Slam and the Moscow Grand Slam, took second in the Samsun Grand Prix, third in the Düsseldorf Grand Prix and the 2013 European Judo Championships. She achieved a world ranking of No. 1 in May 2013.

2013 World Champion
In August 2013, at the age of 24, she won the gold medal at the 2013 World Judo Championships in Rio de Janeiro in the category -63 kg (139 lbs.), defeating each of her five opponents unconditionally. She defeated No. 2-ranked Clarisse Agbegnenou of France, the European champion, in the final by dislocating her shoulder and rendering her unconscious with a chokehold in 43 seconds. She recorded an ippon in each of her five fights on the way to the championship. Commenting on the reaction from Israelis to her championship, she said: "I received three marriage proposals."

Gerbi became the first Israeli to win a gold medal at the Judo World Championships. Israelis Yael Arad (1991 – bronze, 1993 – silver), Oren Smadja (1995 – silver), and Ariel Ze’evi (2001 – silver) had each previously won a silver medal in the championships, and Alice Schlesinger had most recently won a bronze medal in 2009; also Olympic medals, which is Gerbi's next goal, have been won by Arad (Barcelona 1992 – silver), Smadja (Barcelona 1992 – bronze), and Ze’evi (Athens 2004 – bronze).

She was voted Israeli Sports Personality of the Year in 2013 by the readers of The Jerusalem Post.

2014–15 

At the 2014 World Judo Championships in the Russian city of Chelyabinsk, Gerbi won the silver medal after losing by an ippon to Frenchwoman Clarice Agbegnenou in the final in the under-63 kilo category.

In December 2014, she was named Israeli Sportswoman of the Year.

In 2015, she won a bronze medal at the 2015 European Games.

On 17 October 2015, Gerbi won the bronze medal in the Paris Grand Slam after defeating Miho Minei from Japan. Two weeks later on 31 October 2015, she won the bronze again, this time in the Abu Dhabi Grand Slam, after defeating Juul Franssen from the Netherlands.

Rio Olympics and retirement
On 9 August 2016, Gerbi won a bronze medal for her native Israel at the 2016 Summer Olympics in Rio de Janeiro, Brazil (shared with Anicka van Emden). Prior to her win, she was ranked among the top 14 eligible female judokas in her category as of May 30, 2016. After losing to hometown Brazilian Mariana Silva in the quarter-finals, she won her next two repechage fights to win the bronze medal.

Gerbi took part in the torch lighting ceremony at the 2017 Maccabiah Games on July 6, 2017.
On October 2, Gerbi announced her retirement from Judo.

Medals
Sources:

See also
 List of select Jewish judokas
 Sports in Israel

References

External links

  (archived)
 
 
 
 
 
 

1989 births
Living people
Israeli Sephardi Jews
Israeli female judoka
Open University of Israel alumni
Sportspeople from Netanya
Israeli people of Tunisian-Jewish descent
Maccabiah Games silver medalists for Israel
Competitors at the 2009 Maccabiah Games
Maccabiah Games medalists in judo
European Games bronze medalists for Israel
European Games medalists in judo
Olympic judoka of Israel
Judoka at the 2015 European Games
World judo champions
Olympic bronze medalists for Israel
Judoka at the 2016 Summer Olympics
Olympic medalists in judo
Medalists at the 2016 Summer Olympics
Jewish Israeli sportspeople
Israeli Mizrahi Jews
Survivor (Israeli TV series) contestants